S. hirsuta  may refer to:
 Sororoditha hirsuta, a pseudoscorpion species found in Brazil
 Staurogyne hirsuta, a plant species native of Cerrado vegetation of Brazil

See also
 Hirsuta